Mahawa (also known as Maho) is a town in the North Western Province of Sri Lanka. It is located in the Kurunegala District. Buddhists, Muslims, Hindus and Christians live in this town. In addition the area contains some famous irrigation tanks such as "Mediyawa" and "Abakolawewa".

Transport 

It has a railway station, Maho railway station (also known as Mahawa railway station), which is located on the Northern line, which runs from Polgahawela to Kankesanthurai. It is near the junction of the Northern Line and the Batticaloa Line.

Education 
Education is delivered free of charge to all students of national schools, according to the government policy.  These schools operate under both Government and Provincial Council.

Schools in the  area
 Vijayaba National College
 Balalla U.B.Wanninayaka Navodya School
 Yapahuwa Madya Maha Vidyalaya
 Koonwewa Madya Vidyalaya
 Bagmeegahawaththa Maha Vidyalaya
 Moragolla Maha Vidyalaya(Makaduwawa)
 Al Madeena Maha Vidyalaya (Tamil Medium School)

References 

Populated places in North Western Province, Sri Lanka